SpellForce 2: Dragon Storm is a video game, a combination of real-time strategy and role-playing, created by German game developers Phenomic as an expansion to their 2006 release SpellForce 2: Shadow Wars after following the previous games SpellForce: The Order of Dawn.

Gameplay 
SpellForce 2: Dragon Storm comes with a campaign scenario, Skirmish Mode, free play mode (which allows the players to run the game without any known missions). Throughout the storyline the player will encounter many new allies or enemies, depending on what the player decides to do.

Plot

Characters
Throughout the storyline the player encounters many new creatures, cults, and civilizations. However, some characters from the previous Spellforce 2 reappear depending on the mission.

As with SpellForce 2, the player controls the Shaikan avatar who tries to save others, the player's main goals being to search for a reason behind the collapsing portals.  As the game progresses, the player uncovers new continents and an ancient style boat ship to help accomplish missions.

Story
The main character controlled by the player is a Shaikan, or a character who has the blood of a dragon. This dragon blood allows resurrection of oneself and followers, as well as the ability to summon followers from different parts of the world instantly to one's side.

The story begins with an attack on the Dwarven homeland, which starts a series of quests through different lands in order to gather assistance and clues. The expansion pack gives the player the chance to play as the Shaikan fully and provides a set of Shaikan buildings and units which will prove useful during the quests.

During the story the player will encounter the original characters from the previous game including areas, some of the areas of the coming years have evolved and look different throughout the game.

The Dark Elf are still at war, as well as the orcs, which appear on the first level and second level and throughout the storyline.

Reception

Dragon Storm was generally received positively.

References

External links
SpellForce 2: Dragon Storm Homepage

2007 video games
Fantasy video games
Real-time strategy video games
Role-playing video games
Video game expansion packs
Video games developed in Germany
Video games featuring protagonists of selectable gender
Windows games
Windows-only games
JoWooD Entertainment games